Venezuela competed in the 2015 Pan American Games in Toronto, Canada from July 10 to 26, 2015.

Track and field athlete Marvin Blanco was the flagbearer of the country at the opening ceremony.

Competitors
The following is the list of number of competitors from Venezuela participating in the Games.

Medalists

The following competitors from Venezuela won medals at the games. In the by discipline sections below, medalists' names are bolded.

|style="text-align:left; width:78%; vertical-align:top;"|

|style="text-align:left; width:22%; vertical-align:top;"|

Archery

Venezuela qualified one male and three female archers based on its performance at the 2014 Pan American Championships.

Athletics

Badminton

Venezuela qualified a team of two athletes (one man and one woman).

Baseball

Venezuela qualified a women's baseball team of 18 athletes.

Women's tournament

Roster

Group A

Bronze medal match

Basketball

Venezuela qualified men's and women's teams, each with 12 athletes, for a total of 24.

Men's tournament

Group A

Seventh place match

Women's tournament

Group B

Seventh place match

Beach volleyball

Venezuela qualified a men's pair.

Bowling

Boxing

Canoeing

Slalom
Venezuela qualified the following athletes:

Sprint
Venezuela qualified 13 athletes in the sprint discipline.

Men

Women

Qualification Legend: QF = Qualify to final; QS = Qualify to semifinal

Cycling

Venezuela qualified 21 cyclists (13 male and 8 female). Some cyclists competed across more than one discipline.

Key
Note – Ranks given for cycling events are for all heats
Q = Qualified for the next round
DNF = Did not finish

BMX

Mountain biking

Road

Key
DNF = Did not finish
DNS = Did not start

Men

Women

Track
Individual sprint

Keirin

Key
Q = Qualified for the next round

Team pursuit and sprint

Key
Q = Qualified for the next round
QG = Qualified for the gold medal race
QB = Qualified for the bronze medal race
QC = Qualified for the classification round

Omnium

Diving

Venezuela qualified four divers (three men and one woman).

Equestrian

Dressage

Eventing

Jumping

Fencing

Venezuela qualified 18 fencers (9 men, 9 women).

Men

Women

Golf

Venezuela qualified a full team of four golfers.

Gymnastics

Artistic
Venezuela qualified 7 athletes.

Men
Team & Individual

Qualification Legend: Q = Qualified to apparatus final

Women
Team & Individual

Qualification Legend: Q = Qualified to apparatus final

Rhythmic
Venezuela qualified two athletes.

Individual

Qualification Legend: Q = Qualified to apparatus final

Individual finals

Trampoline
Venezuela qualified one athlete.

Judo

Venezuela qualified twelve judokas (five men and seven women).

Men

Women

Karate

Venezuela qualified a full team of ten karatekas.

Men

Women

Modern pentathlon

Venezuela qualified two male modern pentathletes.

Racquetball

Venezuela qualified a team of two men and two women for a total of four athletes.

Roller sports

Venezuela has qualified four athletes (two per gender) in the speed competitions, the maximum team size.

Speed

Rowing

Venezuela qualified five boats and seven rowers (four men and three women).

Men

Qualification Legend: FA=Final A (medal); FB=Final B (non-medal); R=Repechage

Sailing

Venezuela qualified 5 boats (6 sailors).

Shooting

Venezuela qualified 15 shooters (ten men and five women).

Men

Women

Softball

Venezuela qualified a men's team of 15 athletes.

Men's tournament

Group A

Semifinals

Final

Grand Final

Swimming

Synchronized swimming

Venezuela qualified a duet team of two athletes.

Table tennis

Venezuela qualified one man and two women.

Taekwondo

Venezuela qualified seven athletes (four men and three women).

Men

Women

Tennis

Venezuela qualified four tennis players (two per gender).

Water polo

Venezuela qualified men's and women's teams, each with 13 athletes, for a total of 26.

Men's tournament

Roster

Group B

Fifth to Eight place

Fifth place match

Women's tournament

Roster

Group B

Fifth to Eight place

Seventh place match

Water skiing

Venezuela qualified one athlete in the wakeboarding competition.

Weightlifting

Venezuela qualified 13 athletes (7 men and 6 women).

Men

Women

Wrestling

Venezuela qualified 17 wrestlers (11 men and six women).

Men
Freestyle

Greco-Roman

Women
Freestyle

See also
Venezuela at the 2016 Summer Olympics

References

Nations at the 2015 Pan American Games
2015
2015 in Venezuelan sport